The 1949 Montana State Bobcats football team was an American football team that represented Montana State University in the Rocky Mountain Conference (RMC) during the 1949 college football season. In its fourth and final season under head coach Clyde Carpenter, the team compiled a 2–5 record.

Schedule

References

Montana State
Montana State Bobcats football seasons
Montana State Bobcats football